Superhighway can refer to:

Information superhighway, a term for the internet
Highways designed for high-speed traffic